Shakya was an ancient eastern sub-Himalayan ethnicity and clan of north-eastern region of the Indian subcontinent, whose existence is attested during the Iron Age. The Shakyas were on the periphery, both geographically and culturally, of the eastern Gangetic plain in the Greater Magadha cultural region.

Location
The Shakyas lived along the foothills of the Himālaya mountains, with their neighbours to the west and south being the kingdom of Kosala, their neighbours to the east across the Rohiṇī river being the related Koliya tribe, while on the north-east they bordered on the Mallakas of Kusinārā. To the north, the territory of the Shakyas stretched into the Himālayas until the forested regions of the mountains, which formed their northern border.

The capital of the Shakyas was the city of Kapilavastu.

Etymology

The Shakyas' name was derived from the Sanskrit root  (, more rarely  or ) meaning "to be able," "worthy," "possible," or "practicable."

History

Origin
The Shakyas were an eastern sub-Himalayan ethnic group on the periphery, both geographically and culturally, of the eastern Gangetic plain in the Greater Magadha cultural region. The Shakyas were of ‘mixed origin’ of Indo-Aryan and Munda descent, with the former group forming a minority. The Shakyas were closely related to their eastern neighbours, the Koliya tribe, with whom they intermarried.

Statehood
By the sixth century BCE, the Shakyas, the Koliyas, Moriyas, and Mallakas lived between the territories of the Kauśalyas to the west and the Licchavikas and Vaidehas to the east, thus separating the Vajjika League from the Kosala kingdom. By that time, the Shakya republic had become a vassal state of the larger Kingdom of Kosala.

During the fifth century itself, one of the members of the ruling aristocratic oligarchy of the Shakyas was Suddhodana. Suddhodana was married to the princess Māyā, who was the daughter of a Koliya noble, and the son of Suddhodana and Māyā was Siddhartha Gautama, the historical Buddha and founder of Buddhism.

During the life of the Buddha, an armed feud opposed the Shakyas and the Koliyas concerning the waters of the river Rohiṇī, which formed the boundary between the two states and whose water was needed by both of them to irrigate their crops. The intervention of the Buddha finally put an end to these hostilities.

After the death of the Buddha, the Shakyas claimed a share of his relics from the Mallakas of Kusinārā on the grounds that he had been a Shakya.

Conquest by Kosala
Shortly after the Buddha's death, the Kauśalya king Viḍūḍabha, who had overthrown his father Pasenadi, invaded the Shakya and Koliya republics, seeking to conquer their territories because they had once been part of Kosala. Viḍūḍabha finally triumphed over the Shakyas and Koliyas and annexed their state after a long war with massive loss of lives on both sides. Details of this war were exaggerated by later Buddhist accounts, which claimed that Viḍūḍabha exterminated the Shakyas in retaliation for having given in marriage to his father the slave girl who became Viḍūḍabha's mother. In actuality, Viḍūḍabha's invasion of Shakya might instead have had similar motivations to the conquest of the Vajjika League by Viḍūḍabha's relative, the Māgadhī king Ajātasattu, who, because he was the son of a Vajjika princess, was therefore interested in the territory of his mother's homeland. The result of the Kauśalya invasion was that the Shakyas and Koliyas merely lost political importance after being annexed into Viḍūḍabha's kingdom. The Shakyas nevertheless soon disappeared as an ethnic group after their annexation, having become absorbed into the population of Kosala, with only a few displaced families maintaining the Shakya identity afterwards. The Koliyas likewise disappeared as a polity and as a tribe soon after their annexation.

The massive life losses incurred by Kosala during its conquest of Shakya and Koliya weakened it significantly enough that it was itself was soon annexed by its eastern neighbour, the kingdom of Magadha, and its king Viḍūḍabha was defeated and killed by the Māgadhī king Ajātasattu.

Legacy

The functioning of the proceedings of Sakka's heaven in Buddhist cosmology are modelled on those of the Shakya santhāgāra.

Social and political organisation

Republican institutions

The Assembly
The heads of the Sakya clans of the   formed an Assembly, and they held the title of s.

The political system of the Sakyas was identical to that of the Koliyas, and like the Koliyas and the other s, the Assembly met in a santhāgāra, the main of which was located at Kapilavatthu, although at least one other Sakya santhāgāra also existed at Cātuma. The judicial and legislative functions of the Assembly of the Sakyas were not distinctly separated, and it met to discuss important issues concerning public affairs, such as war, peace, and alliances. The Sakya Assembly deliberated on important issues, and it had a simple voting system through either raising hands or the use of wooden chips.

The Council
Similarly to the other s, the Sakya Assembly met rarely and it instead had an inner and smaller Council which met more often to administer the republic in the name of the Assembly. The members of the Council, titled s, formed a college which was directly in charge of public affairs of the republic.

The  (Consul)
The  was in charge of administering the republic with the help of the Council.

Functioning of the Assembly
When sessions of the Assembly were held, the s gathered in the santhāgāra; while four s were posted in the four corners or sides of the hall so as to clearly and easily hear the speeches made by the s; and the consul  took his appointed seat and put forward the matters to be discussed once the Assembly was ready.

During the session, the members of the Assembly expressed their views, which the four s would record. The Assembly was then adjourned, after which the recorders compared their notes, and all the s came back and waited for the recorders' decision.

Class society
The society of the Shakyas and Koliyas was a stratified one within which were present at least the aristocratic, land-owning, attendant, labourer, and serf classes. Landholders held the title of s, literally meaning "enjoyers (of the right to own land)," and used in the sense of "headmen." The lower classes of Shakya society consisted of servants, in Pāli called s and s, who performed the labour in the farms.

Culture

Non-Vedic
The Shakyas lived in what scholars presently call the Greater Magadha cultural area, which was located in the eastern Gangetic plain to the east of the confluence of the Gaṅgā and Yamunā rivers.

Language
The Shakyas were an Indo-Aryan people under the linguistic influence of Munda languages, as attested by many of their villages having non-Indo-Aryan names, and the name of the founder of their clan, which has been recorded in the Sanskrit form  and the Pali form , being of Munda origin.

Religion
Since they lived in the Greater Magadha cultural area, the Shakyas followed non-Vedic religious customs which drastically differed from the Brahmanical tradition, and even by the time of the Buddha, Brahmanism and the s had not acquired religious or cultural preponderance in the Greater Magadha area to which Shakya belonged.

It was in this non-Vedic cultural environment that  movements existed, with one of them, Buddhism, having been founded by the Shakya Siddhartha Gautama, the historical Buddha.

Sun worship

Origin myth

This myth was also a foundation myth of the city which, as the residence of the ruling families of the clan, the city, which was the centre of political and economic activity, was associated with that clan's  (territory), and was equated with the whole  itself.

The myth of the Shakyas' ancestors being four pairs of married twin siblings was a myth which traced the origins of the ruling Shakya families to a common ancestor, and was also a myth of an early human utopia where humans were born as couples.

Tree worship
The important role of the Sāl tree in the life of the Buddha according to the Buddhist texts, as well as his representation as a Bodhi tree and his Enlightenment occurring under one such tree, suggest that the Shakyas practised tree worship, a custom likely derived from Munda religious customs of worshipping sacred groves, and the important role in their traditions of the Sāl tree, whose flowering marks the beginning of their New Year and Flower Feast festivals: the Santal tribe worship the Sāl tree and gather to make communal decisions under them Sāl trees.

The importance of the tree spirits called s and s in Pali (s and s in Sanskrit) in early Buddhist texts is an attestation of the worship of these beings done at  s. The worship of s and s, which was of pre-Indo-Aryan autochthonous origin, was prevalent in the Greater Magadha region.

Serpent worship
The  king Mucalinda, who in Buddhist mythology protected the Buddha during a storm under a mucalinda tree, was a both snake- and a tree-deity, thus alluding to the practice of serpent worship among the Shakyas, which originated from among the pre-Indo-Aryan Tibeto-Burman populations of northern South Asia.

Marriage customs

Funerary customs
The cremation rituals of the Shakyas which were performed for the funeral of the Buddha as described by Buddhist texts involved wrapping his body in 500 layers of cloth, placing it in an iron vat full of oil as a mark of honour, and then covering it with another iron pot before being cremated. These rites originated from the pre-Indo-Aryan autochthonous populations of the eastern Gangetic plains, as were the practices such as honouring the Buddha's body with singing, dancing, and music, as well as placing his bones in a golden urn, the veneration of these remains and their burial in a round  which possessed a central mast, flags, pennants, and parasols at a public crossroads, which were rituals that were performed by the pre-Indo-Aryan populations for their greater rulers.

Other hypothesis 
These scholars have suggested that the people of the Buddha were Saka soldiers who arrived into South Asia in the army of Darius I when he conquered the Indus Valley, and saw in Scytho-Saka nomadism the origin of the wandering asceticism of the Buddha. The scholar Bryan Levman however criticised this hypothesis for resting on slim to no evidence, and maintains that the Shakyas were a population native to the north-east Gangetic plain who were unrelated to the Iranic Sakas.

Descent claims 
Tharu people of Tarai region of India and Nepal claim descent from Sakya. Significant population of Newars of Kathmandu valley in Nepal use the surname Shakya and also claim to be the descendants of the Shakya clan with titles such as Śākyavamsa (of the Shakya lineage) having been used in the past.

According to Hmannan Yazawin, first published in 1823, the legendary king Abhiyaza, who founded the Tagaung Kingdom and the Burmese monarchy belonged to the same Shakya clan of the Buddha. He migrated to present-day Burma after the annexation of the Shakya kingdom by Kosala. The earlier Burmese accounts stated that he was a descendant of Pyusawhti, son of a solar spirit and a dragon princess.

Chakma people of Chittagong Hill Tracts, Northeast India, and Myanmar in the state of Chin and Arakan believe that they are a part of the Buddha's Shakya Clan. They migrated to Burma due to persecution led by many rulers against Buddhists from Magadha (present day Bihar).The name Chakma can be classified into two words "Chak" and "Ma". The name "Chakma" was given by the Burmese kings, which literally translate to  "the Shakya man" in the Burmese kanguage. "Chak" refers to Shakya and "Ma" refers to people or human.

References

Sources

 

 
 

Family of Gautama Buddha
Empires and kingdoms of Nepal
Ancient peoples of Nepal
Gaṇa saṅghas